Scott Bauhs (born May 11, 1986) is an American professional distance runner sponsored by Asics and runs for Asics Aggies.  He is a former Chico State runner for NCAA Division II athletics. He is the youngest American to complete both the four-minute mile and the 28-minute 10,000-meter run.

He ran a half marathon best of 1:01:30 hours at the 2012 Houston Marathon, placing third overall.

Bauhs has a high school level, cross country race named after him. The Scott Bauhs Invitational is held in Pleasanton, California and was first started in 2006.  The course is 3 miles with 90% hard-packed dirt.  A few small inclines, with none over 150 metres. Luis Luna of (Piner High School) set the men's course record of 14:44 minutes in 2011, while Jena Pianin (Amador Valley High School) has the women's record of 17:38 minutes from 2012.

Competition record

USA National Championships

Outdoor Track and Field

Indoor Track and Field

Cross Country

Road Running

NCAA championships

Outdoor Track and Field

Cross Country

Running career

High school
While running for San Ramon Valley High School, Bauhs improved every year.  As he improved, he had the smaller Division I schools recruiting him in his junior year.  He signed with Chico State, but at the end of his senior season, after he finished second at the CIF California State Meet in the 3200 meters, there were much bigger schools such as Oregon that were interested.

Collegiate
Bauhs decided to stay at Chico, and there he became one of the most successful Division 2 collegiate athletes in history. He amassed eight All-Americans honors. He also won three national titles.

During the 2007 track season, Bauhs beat Nicodemus Naimadu of Abilene Christian to win the 10k title.  Naimadu was previously undefeated.  Later on, Bauhs broke the four-minute-mile barrier, and American Age Group Records in the half-marathon.  He also broke the NCAA Division II American records in the 5k and 10k.  During his time at Chico, Bauhs ran under coach Gary Towne.

Achievements
2007 Chiba Ekiden Team USA Member
2008 World Cross Country Team USA Member
2009 World Half Marathon Team USA Member
2010 World Cross Country Team USA Member
2007 NCAA DII 10,000 m Champion
2007 NCAA DII 5,000 m Runner-up
2008 NCAA DII 5,000 m Champion
2008 NCAA DII Cross Country Champion
2008 US Club Cross Country National Champion
2010 US Cross Country Championships 3rd place
2010 US Indoor Championships 4th place 3000 m
NCAA DII 10,000 m Record
2008 USTFCCCA NCAA DII Track & Field Athlete of the Year
2007-2008 CCAA Athlete of the Year
2006-2009 Chico State Athlete of the Year
4-time USTFCCCA All-American NCAA DII Cross Country 
4-time USTFCCCA All-American NCAA DII Track & Field
21 and under US age group record in half marathon
2nd 2003 California State track & field championships 3200 m
Finished 6th in the 2010 Bay to Breakers 12k run
Finished 51st in the 2008 IAAF World Cross Country Championships
 #4 on 2008 USA list for 10,000 m
 #4 best American in 10,000 m collegiate history
 3rd at the USA Track and Field Championships 10,000m 2011
 Finished #14 at the 2011 Daegu IAAF World Championships (3rd American) 
 Boy Scouts of America Eagle Scout

Personal bests
1500 meters – 3:41.34 (2009)
Mile – 3:59.81 (2008)
3000 meters – 7:50.27 (2010)
5000 meters – 13:28.40 (2012)
10,000 meters – 27:48.06 (2008)
5 km – 13:37 (2008)
10 km – 28:30 relay leg (2007)
Half marathon – 1:01:30 (2012)
Marathon – 2:23:02 (2016)

References

External links

 Mammoth Track Club Profile

1986 births
Living people
American male long-distance runners
Track and field athletes from Denver
California State University, Chico alumni
People from Mammoth Lakes, California
Track and field athletes from California